Purple Sunset is a 2001 Chinese war drama film written and directed by Feng Xiaoning. Feng also acted as the film's cinematographer.

Purple Sunset is an anti-war film set in August 1945, at the time during the Soviet invasion of Manchuria and when the Japanese were in the throes of defeat during World War II and losing control of mainland China. The film won Best Special Effects at the Huabiao Awards and Best Cinematography at the Golden Rooster Award.  It was also voted Best Feature by the audience during the 2001 Hawaii International Film Festival. Feng considered it the last of his  "War and Peace" (战争与和平) trilogy, preceded by Red River Valley (1997), and Lover's Grief over the Yellow River (1999).

Plot
The film begins with an interview of an elderly Chinese man Yang in 2000 and begins reminiscing about the Second Sino-Japanese War, prompted on by a journalist. He grasps an old okiagari-koboshi musical doll which brings his memories back to August 1945, near the end of the war.

At Mt. Grand Xingan in 1945, Yang, a Hebei peasant in his 30s, was captured by Japanese imperial soldiers, and was brought to the Daxing'anling area near Manchuria (bordering the Soviet Union) after the Japanese slaughtered his aged mother. He was put in a firing squad to be executed. The firing killed everyone in line but Yang. As a Japanese soldier reloaded the machine gun, a Soviet T-34 tank knocked over the wall which the captives were lined. The tank crushes a Japanese soldier and saves Yang's life. Yang was the sole survivor and was put under the charge of Nadja, a young female Soviet lieutenant and her comrades. Nadja was tasked with escorting Yang to headquarters, but their truck driver Shakov took a wrong turn and strayed into a Japanese garrison. Most of Soviet soldiers on the truck were killed in the ensuing skirmish but Nadja, a Soviet tank soldier and Yang escaped into a forested area.

As the three crossed a bridge, they came under a grenade attack from a teenage Japanese schoolgirl named Akiyoko and her older sister in a wooden shed. After being confronted by Shakov, Akiyoko's sister commits suicide by swallowing a cyanide capsule. After Akiyoko attempts to commit suicide the same way but is stopped by Shakov. Fearing that releasing her will alert the Japanese troops, the three take Akiyoko captive and force her to lead them out of the vast forest as a guide. Akiyoko brought the three to a minefield where Shakov was blown up by a land mine. Realizing that Akiyoko had led them into a death trap, Nadja was infuriated by the death of her comrade, but decided not to kill her as she was their sole guide. Nadja carries very little food, both Yang and Akiyoko follow her for this reason: without Nadja they would not make it out of the forest alive.

Feeling betrayed by Akiyoko's cunningness, Akiyoko is forcefully tied to a tree. Nadja hands Yang a dagger to kill Akiyoko, Yang falters at the last second and hesitates due to a flashback. Yang remembers the Japanese tying his elderly mother and himself to wooden posts when they invaded his village, and used bayonets to stab his mother to death in front of his very eyes. Faltering, Yang drops the blade and convulses into tears. Afterwards, Yang decides to continue the path with Nadja, leaving Akiyoko stranded in the forest and left to die. However, in a stroke of mercy, he returns and frees Akiyoko, taking her along with them.

At many points both Yang and Nadja were tempted to kill Akiyoko, but eventually saved her life from drowning in a quagmire. That night, Yang encounters another flashback; being forced by the Japanese to dump the bodies of dead Chinese civilians into the river. One victim makes an effort to signal Yang that he is still alive, when Yang conveys this information to the Japanese captors, they forcefully place the victim into a sack and proceed to burn him alive. Delighted by this sadistic endeavour, they then tie a bundle of live grenades to the sack and dump him into the river. A traumatized Yang looks on with pain and anguish.

By the third day, the three make it out of the forest alive. To the north lies flat, open grassland that stretches on forever. When crossing the plains, they witness a dogfight occur between a Japanese Mitsubishi Zero and another plane. The Japanese fighter starts emitting a trail of black smoke and crashes into the field behind them. Akiyoko is reminded of her childhood sweetheart Onishi, who was conscripted as a fighter pilot by the Japanese air force, and in a sudden urge of desperation, runs towards the downed plane. Worried, Yang follows her. The wreckage soon is engulfed in flames, and the fire catches on to the surrounding grass. The fire starts spreading and rages towards them. Knowing that they are unable to outrun the spread of the flames, Akiyoko saves the lives of Yang and Nadja by telling them to stay low to the ground on a burnt patch of grass.

After the fire is over, Yang realizes that Akiyoko is capable of speaking Chinese. He frees her by cutting the rope binding her hands. Yang and Nadja later learn about Akiyoko's background: she moved to China when she was four years old, and grew up in Mt. Grand Xingan. Her father was the owner of a lumber farm. When the Japanese conscripted her father to the front line, he instructed her to flee with her sister to the seaside where they would cross the sea to the Japanese mainland. However, having been dispersed among the refugees, they became lost and ended up in the hideout where they encountered Shakov.

Although Nadja wanted to move north to meet up with the Soviet troops, Akiyoko convinced Yang moving south was the only way out of the forest. Conflicting feelings of mistrust and friendship dogged all three as they rely on one another to survive. At one point, a sudden rainstorm caused Nadja to stray from her two partners whilst searching for food. Yang and Akiyoko waited for two days for Nadja's return, but Nadja was able to find her way back after hearing Yang firing her accidentally PPSh-41 submachine gun at an attacking tiger. Akiyoko discovers that despite Yang not knowing how to fire a gun, he refused to let her touch it. From that day on, Yang develops a curiosity towards Nadja's gun, and teaches himself how to use it.

The three eventually found their way to the same location where they confronted the Japanese troops, and Yang and Nadja realized they have been tricked by Akiyoko by circling around the forest. A tearful Akiyoko explained she was trying to get them to surrender to the Japanese troops so that they could get food and lodging at the camp. The three ended up back at the Soviet truck which they had earlier left during the skirmish with the Japanese troops, where the radio began to announce Emperor Hirohito's unconditional surrender to the Allied troops. Akiyoko, shocked and humiliated by Japan's loss, grabbed Nadja's PPSh-41 and took aim at Yang and Nadja. Yang advanced on Akiyoko, placing the muzzle of the gun against his chest. Akiyoko was unable to fire the gun, and convulsed into sobs. Nadja then discovered that Yang had removed the cartridges from the gun before Akiyoko picked it up.

The war having now ended, Yang urged Akiyoko to go back to Japan and live a good life. Akiyoko tells Yang that she wishes to return to Japan in search of Onishi. Unfortunately, Onishi was part of the final fleet of Kamikaze fighter pilots sent to their deaths on August 16, 1945, one day after the Japanese surrender. The scene then transitions to Onishi being instructed to crash his fighter plane into American battleships. While in flight, Onishi attempts to escape from the cockpit, only to find it locked. Resigned to his doomed fate, Onishi crashes his plane into the sea, which subsequently explodes.

Having heard a series of loud explosions, the three then witness a group of Japanese soldiers and civilians committing mass suicide as they could not accept the fact their country had surrendered. Akiyoko mistakenly thought they were not informed of the surrender and ran to stop their foolish acts, but was shot in the head by a Japanese captain. Akiyoko's okiagari-koboshi doll rolled out of her grasp and she died.

Consumed by fury and vengeance, Yang and Nadja drove the truck and attacked the remaining Japanese soldiers, who were charging at them. After all of Japanese soldiers were killed, Yang picked up Akiyoko's okiagari-koboshi doll. The film then fast-forwards to present day where an elderly, wheelchair-bound Nadja places flowers on Poklonnaya Gora war memorial with the large numerals "1945" to commemorate Akiyoko's death. The film then flashes back to 1945, where a voice from the truck's radio read out a declaration of peace and harmony, as the remaining Japanese troops toss their weapons aside as they make their way towards the sunset. Nadja points out to Yang that the sunset is purple, a sight that Akiyoko cherished. A statistic of World War II casualties rolls up at the credit.

Cast
Fu Dalong as Yang, a peasant farmer who was initially to be executed by the Japanese firing squad. In a stroke of luck, he was saved by the Soviets liberating his village the moment he was about to be executed. After being found by the Soviets, he's handed over to Nadja.
Chie Maeda as Akiyoko, a young schoolgirl who Yang and Nadja encounter when they cross a bridge into Japanese territory. 
Anna Dzenilalova as Nadja, a Soviet lieutenant who is ordered to take care of Yang when he is found alive.

References

External links

2001 films
2000s Mandarin-language films
Chinese war drama films
Films directed by Feng Xiaoning
Chinese World War II films
Second Sino-Japanese War films
Films set in forests
Films set in China
Films set in Manchukuo
Films set in Moscow
Films set in Russia
Films shot in China
2000s war drama films
Films set in the 1940s
Films set in 1945
2000s Chinese films